Woodruff is a given name. Notable people with the name include:

 Woodruff Leeming (1870–1919), American architect
 Woodruff T. Sullivan III (born 1944), American astronomer

English-language masculine given names
English masculine given names
Lists of people by given name